The Forrey Building and Annex is a historic site in LaBelle, Florida. It is located at 264 through 282 Bridge Street. On July 28, 1995, it was added to the U.S. National Register of Historic Places.

References

External links

 Hendry County listings at National Register of Historic Places
 Florida's Office of Cultural and Historical Programs
 Hendry County listings
 Forrey Building and Annex
 Famous Floridians of LaBelle

Buildings and structures in Hendry County, Florida
Commercial buildings on the National Register of Historic Places in Florida
National Register of Historic Places in Hendry County, Florida